The Vidå (North Frisian Widuu) is a creek in The Jutland region of, Denmark. The creek starts east of Tønder and flows to the west, ending in the North Sea. In places the Vidå marks the border between Denmark and Germany (through the Rudbøl Sø).

South of the river live the North Frisians.

Rivers of Jutland
Denmark–Germany border
International rivers of Europe